Marvin Herman Shoob (February 23, 1923 – June 12, 2017) was a United States district judge of the United States District Court for the Northern District of Georgia.

Education and career

Born in Walterboro, South Carolina, Shoob was in the United States Army during World War II, from 1942 to 1945, becoming a Sergeant. He received a Juris Doctor from the University of Georgia School of Law in 1948. He was in private practice in Atlanta, Georgia from 1948 to 1979.

Federal judicial service

On June 5, 1979, Shoob was nominated by President Jimmy Carter to a new seat on the United States District Court for the Northern District of Georgia  created by 92 Stat. 1629. He was confirmed by the United States Senate on July 23, 1979, and received his commission on July 24, 1979. He assumed senior status on September 30, 1991. He took inactive senior status on February 23, 2016, serving in that capacity until his death on June 12, 2017, at his home in Atlanta, Georgia.

References

Sources
FJC Bio

1923 births
2017 deaths
People from Walterboro, South Carolina
Military personnel from South Carolina
Judges of the United States District Court for the Northern District of Georgia
United States district court judges appointed by Jimmy Carter
20th-century American judges
United States Army non-commissioned officers
University of Georgia School of Law alumni
United States Army personnel of World War II